is a Japanese politician of the Democratic Party of Japan, a member of the House of Representatives in the Diet (national legislature).

A native of the former Ōyama, Toyama and graduate of Doshisha University, Murai was elected to the House of Representatives for the first time in 2003.

References

External links 
 Official website in Japanese.

1973 births
Living people
People from Toyama (city)
Doshisha University alumni
Members of the House of Representatives (Japan)
Democratic Party of Japan politicians
21st-century Japanese politicians